Dauren Zhumagaziyev (born July 18, 1989 in Taldykorgan) is a male wrestler from Kazakhstan.

External links
 

Living people
1989 births
Kazakhstani male sport wrestlers
Olympic wrestlers of Kazakhstan
Wrestlers at the 2012 Summer Olympics
Asian Games medalists in wrestling
Wrestlers at the 2010 Asian Games
Wrestlers at the 2014 Asian Games
World Wrestling Championships medalists
Asian Games bronze medalists for Kazakhstan

Medalists at the 2010 Asian Games
Asian Wrestling Championships medalists
People from Taldykorgan